Yingkou is a coastal prefecture-level city of central southern Liaoning province, People's Republic of China, on the northeastern shore of Liaodong Bay. It borders the sub-provincial city of Dalian to the south, the prefectural cities of Anshan to the north and east and Panjin to the northwest, and also shares maritime boundaries with Jinzhou and Huludao across the Liaodong Bay to its west.

Located on the east bank of the Daliao River mouth, Yingkou is an important port city, with the Port of Yingkou being the second-largest container port in the Bohai Sea (after the Port of Tianjin) and Northeast China (after the Port of Dalian), the tenth-largest nationwide, and the 25th-busiest worldwide. Yingkou is classified as a Medium-Port Metropolis.

Name
Yingkou was historically known as Newchwang (Manchu: Ishangga gašan hoton) in postal romanization; it was one of the Treaty Ports opened under the Treaties of Tianjin of 1858.  In fact, the actual town of Newchwang was about thirty miles upstream of Liao He, within today's county-level city of Haicheng. After the treaty had been signed, the British found that the river near Newchwang was too shallow for their ships. Instead, the treaty port was moved to the area nearer to the river mouth where today's Yingkou is located.

To avoid confusion between the two locations, careful English writers of the early 20th century would sometimes use Newchwang for Yingkou (explaining that "Ying-kow, ... outside Manchuria, ... is known only as Newchwang") and Niu-chuang (the proper Wade–Giles transcription of '') for the actual inland Niuzhuang Town. Meanwhile, Newchwangcheng (postal: Newchwang Town) was adopted by the government as the inland town's name to distinguish it from the coastal city.

Administrative divisions

Yingkou prefecture is subdivided into 4 districts and 2 cities:

Geography

Yingkou is mostly located in the northwestern part of the Liaodong Peninsula, and on the left bank of the mouth of Daliao River, which was historically the main distributary of the lower Liao River and the principal exit of fluvial transports from inland Liaoning into the Bohai Sea.

Climate
Yingkou has a four-season humid continental climate (Köppen Dwa) with strong monsoonal influences. Though the climate is somewhat tempered by the city's location on the Bohai Gulf, winters are long, windy, cold but dry, and summers are hot and humid. Precipitation is somewhat enhanced by the coastal location, with a majority of the annual rainfall occurring in July and August alone. With monthly percent possible sunshine ranging from 51% in July to 68% in three months, the city receives 2,774 hours  of bright sunshine annually.

Industrial zones
China Minmetals (Yingkou) industrial park
 Yingkou Economic & Technological Development Zone. So far, five key industries have been formed, which are steel, chemical industry, mineral processing, logistics, textile and garment industry.

Transportation
Yingkou is served by the Yingkou Lanqi Airport.

Sport
The city is home to the basketball club Liaoning Flying Leopards of the Chinese Basketball Association. The club brought forth several players of China's national basketball team. It plays its home games at the Benxi Gymnasium.

Partnership town and ports
  Jacksonville, Florida, United States — twinned since 1990.
  Tver, Russia — twinned since 1994.
  Yingkou Port signed a Sister Port agreement with the Hamilton Port Authority of Hamilton, Ontario, Canada in November 2005.

References

External links

 Official Website
 Yingkou China
 The coastal base development project

 
Cities in Liaoning
Prefecture-level divisions of Liaoning